The 2021 season was the 14th season for the IPL cricket franchise Royal Challengers Bangalore.They were one of the eight teams competed in the tournament. The team was captained by Virat Kohli with Mike Hesson as a team coach. After qualifying for the playoffs, they were eliminated from the tournament as they were beaten by Kolkata Knight Riders in the Eliminator match.

This was the last season in IPL for AB de Villiers who announced his retirement on 19 November 2021. RCB Team 2023 Player List, Retained, Release Player Name, Squad

Background

Player retention and transfers 

The Royal Challengers Bangalore retained 12 players and released ten players.

Retained Players: Virat Kohli (C), AB de Villiers (VC), Devdutt Padikkal, Mohammed Siraj, Navdeep Saini, Washington Sundar, Yuzvendra Chahal, Josh Philippe, Pavan Deshpande, Shahbaz Ahmed, Adam Zampa, Kane Richardson, Daniel Sams, Harshal Patel

Released Players: Chris Morris, Aaron Finch, Moeen Ali, Isuru Udana, Dale Steyn, Shivam Dube, Umesh Yadav, Pawan Negi, Gurkeerat Mann, Parthiv Patel (retired).

Added Players: Glenn Maxwell, Mohammed Azharuddeen, Sachin Baby, Kyle Jamieson, Srikar Bharat, Rajat Patidar, Dan Christian, Suyash Prabhudessai, Finn Allen

Squad
 Players with international caps are listed in bold.

Administration and support staff

Kit manufacturers and sponsors

|

Teams and standings

Results by match

League stage

The full schedule was published on the IPL website on 7 March 2021.

Matches

Playoffs

Eliminator

Statistics

Most runs

Glenn Maxwell was the fifth-highest run scorer in IPL 2021
 Source: Cricinfo

Most wickets

Harshal Patel won the Purple Cap as he is highest wicket taker in the competition.
 Source: Cricinfo

Player of the match awards

References

External links
Official Website
 

2021 Indian Premier League
Royal Challengers Bangalore seasons